Lara Dolecek is an American coding theorist known for her work on low-density parity-check codes. She works in the UCLA Henry Samueli School of Engineering and Applied Science as a professor of electrical and computer engineering and area director for signals and systems.

Education and career
Dolecek studied in the department of electrical engineering and computer science at the University of California, Berkeley, earning a bachelor's degree, master's degree, and Ph.D. there; she also has a master's degree in statistics from Berkeley. She joined the faculty at the University of California, Los Angeles after postdoctoral research at the Massachusetts Institute of Technology. She also serves on the board of governors of the IEEE Information Theory Society.

Book
With Frederic Sala, Dolecek is the coauthor of the book Channel Coding Methods for Non-Volatile Memories (Foundations and Trends in Communications and Information Theory, Now Publishing, 2016).

Recognition
Dolecek was named a Distinguished Lecturer of the IEEE Information Theory Society for 2021–2022.

Personal life
Dolecek is the daughter of electronics engineering professor Gordana Jovanovic Dolecek and mechanical engineering professor Vlatko Doleček.

References

External links
Home page

Year of birth missing (living people)
Living people
Coding theorists
American telecommunications engineers
American women engineers
University of California, Berkeley alumni
University of California, Los Angeles faculty